Marie Luise Claudius (6 January 1912 – 2 August 1941) was a German actress.

Claudius was the daughter of the court actor and writer Erich Claudius and the actress Lisbeth Reschke. During her childhood, she appeared several times on the stage of the Meininger Theater. Her first engagement was in 1932 in Düsseldorf.

At the age of 29 years she died of heart failure and was buried in the New Cemetery Wannsee in Berlin. Her grave has since been lost.

Filmography
 Ripening Youth (as Christa von Borck, a high schooler) (1933)
 Das verlorene Tal (as Verena Stettler, daughter) (1934)
 The Voice of Love (as Zenzi (as Marie Luise Claudius) (1934)
 Trouble with Jolanthe (as Sophie, her sister) (1934)
 Peer Gynt (as Solveig) (1934)
 The Valley of Love (as Lisbeth) (1935)
 The Red Rider (as Etelka, her daughter) (1935)
 I Was Jack Mortimer (as Marie Polikow) (1935)
 The Old and the Young King (as Princess Wilhelmine) (1935)
  (as Suzanne Merville) (1936)
 Augustus the Strong (1936) (as Countess Anna Constanze Cosel) (1936)
 Pan (as Eva) (1937)
 The Man Who Was Sherlock Holmes (as Mary Berry) (1937)
 Einmal werd' ich Dir gefallen (as Matthesi Stuck) (1938)
 Maja zwischen zwei Ehen (as Eva Adrian) (1938)
 Schatten über St. Pauli (as Hanna Carstens) (1938)
 Ein Robinson (as Antje) (1940)

External links

German film actresses
German stage actresses
1912 births
1941 deaths
20th-century German actresses